In Greek mythology, the name Zeuxippus  (Ancient Greek: Ζεύξιππος) may refer to:

Zeuxippus, son of Apollo.
Zeuxippus, a prince of Pherae as the son of King Eumelus and possibly, Iphthime, daughter of Icarius of Sparta. He was the father of Armenius, himself father of Henioche.

Notes

References 

Pausanias, Description of Greece with an English Translation by W.H.S. Jones, Litt.D., and H.A. Ormerod, M.A., in 4 Volumes. Cambridge, MA, Harvard University Press; London, William Heinemann Ltd. 1918. . Online version at the Perseus Digital Library
Pausanias, Graeciae Descriptio. 3 vols. Leipzig, Teubner. 1903.  Greek text available at the Perseus Digital Library.

Princes in Greek mythology
Thessalian mythology